Dublin County South was a parliamentary constituency represented in Dáil Éireann, the lower house of the Irish parliament or Oireachtas from 1969 to 1981. The constituency elected 3 deputies (Teachtaí Dála, commonly known as TDs) to the Dáil, using proportional representation by means of the single transferable vote (PR-STV).

History and boundaries 
The constituency was created by the Electoral (Amendment) Act 1969, and first used at the 1969 general election. It was abolished by the Electoral (Amendment) Act 1980, with effect from the 1981 general election.

TDs

Elections

1977 general election

1973 general election

1970 by-election 
Following the resignation of Fianna Fáil TD Kevin Boland, a by-election was held on 2 December 1970. The seat was won by the Fine Gael candidate Larry McMahon.

1969 general election

See also 
Dáil constituencies
Politics of the Republic of Ireland
Historic Dáil constituencies
Elections in the Republic of Ireland

References

External links 
Oireachtas Members Database
Dublin Historic Maps: Parliamentary & Dail Constituencies 1780–1969 (a work in progress)

Dáil constituencies in County Dublin (historic)
1969 establishments in Ireland
1981 disestablishments in Ireland
Constituencies established in 1969
Constituencies disestablished in 1981